David McVey (born c. 1966) is a former Scottish rugby union player who played for Glasgow Rugby, now Glasgow Warriors at the number 8 position.

Rugby union career

Amateur career

At amateur level, McVey played for Greenock Wanderers, Ayr RFC, Stirling County and West of Scotland.

Professional and provincial career

Before playing for the professional Glasgow Warriors side, McVey frequently represented the amateur provincial Glasgow District side.

He was one of the famous players who played in Glasgow's unbeaten season of 1989-90. He played 5 out of 6 district matches that season and won that year's Scottish Inter-District Championship.

The veteran loose forward was in Glasgow's squad for their first season as a professional club in 1996-97.

He was on the bench for Glasgow's European Conference match away to Newport RFC on 26 October 1996. He came on as a temporary replacement to David McLeish in that match.

He was also named on the bench for Glasgow's next European match against Agen on 30 October 1996. He did not, however, play in that match.

Coaching career

He was the First Team Coach of Greenock Wanderers. but is now the head coach of Bute Rugby Club.

Outside of rugby

McVey works as a gardener at Mount Stuart and breeds poultry as a hobby.

References

External links
 McVey biography in the Glasgow Herald
 Warriors honour winning greats
Children- Andrew McVey, Peter McVey

1960s births
Living people
Scottish rugby union coaches
Scottish rugby union players
Glasgow Warriors players
Rugby union number eights
West of Scotland FC players
Stirling County RFC players
Greenock Wanderers RFC players
Glasgow District (rugby union) players